Pulver is the German word for powder (from ) and may refer to:

People
 David L. Pulver (born 1965), Canadian freelance writer and game designer
 Hans Pulver (1902–1977), Swiss football player
 Jeff Pulver (born 1962), American Internet entrepreneur
 Jens Pulver (born 1974), U.S.-based professional mixed martial artist
 Joseph S. Pulver Sr. (born 1955), American writer
 Lara Pulver (born 1980), English actress
 Lev Pulver (aka Leib Pulver, Leo Pulver, 1883–1970), Russian composer and violinist
 Liselotte Pulver (aka Lilo Pulver, born 1929), Swiss actress
 Max Pulver (1889–1952), Swiss writer of graphology books

Other uses
 Pulver (album), an album by the Swedish band Lifelover

See also
 
 Ensign Pulver, a 1964 American film